Acianthera chrysantha is a species of orchid plant native to Mexico.

References 

chrysantha
Flora of Mexico